The Melrose Heights–Oak Lawn–Fairview Historic District is a predominantly residential historic district in eastern Columbia, South Carolina. It encompasses much of the neighborhood of Melrose Heights, and is formed out of three separate subdivisions that were developed as a streetcar suburb originally outside the city boundary in the first half of the 20th century. It is bounded on the east by Woodrow Street, the north by Gervais Street and Trenholm Road, the south by Millwood Avenue and Michigan Street, and the east by Butler and Princeton Streets and Maiden Lane. The area was originally farmland owned by members of the locally prominent Powell family. Although it features modest houses in a wide variety of styles, it has a particular concentration of "airplane" bungalow cottages.

The district was added to the National Register of Historic Places in 2016.

See also
National Register of Historic Places listings in Columbia, South Carolina

References

Historic districts on the National Register of Historic Places in South Carolina
National Register of Historic Places in Columbia, South Carolina